The 1971 World Figure Skating Championships were held in Lyon, France, from February 23 to 28. At the event, sanctioned by the International Skating Union, medals were awarded in men's singles, ladies' singles, pair skating, and ice dance.

The ISU Representative was John R. Shoemaker of the United States and the ISU Technical Delegate was Elemér Terták of Hungary.

Medal table

Results

Men

Referee:
 Elemér Terták 

Assistant Referee:
 Donald H. Gilchrist 

Judges:
 Helga von Wiecki 
 Milan Duchón 
 Michele Beltrami 
 Geoffrey Yates 
 Kinuko Ueno 
 Vera Curceac 
 Norman E. Fuller 
 Tatiana Danilenko 
 Monique Georgelin

Ladies

Referee:
 Josef Dědič 

Assistant Referee:
 Sonia Bianchetti 

Judges:
 Nonna Nestegina 
 Eva von Gamm 
 Walburga Grimm 
 Elof Niklasson 
 Mary Louis Wright 
 Éva György 
 Ludwig Gassner 
 Giorgio Siniscalco 
 Barbara Graham

Pairs

Referee:
 Karl Enderlin 

Assistant Referee:
 Néri Valdes 

Judges:
 Jürg Wilhelm 
 Carla Listing 
 Pamela Davis 
 Monique Petis 
 Norman E. Fuller 
 Eva von Gamm 
 Edwin Kucharz 
 Maria Zuchowicz 
 Nonna Nestegina

Ice dance

Referee:
 Emil Skákala 

Assistant Referee:
 Henri Meudec 

Judges:
 Dagmar Řeháková 
 Mary Louise Wright 
 Lysiane Lauret 
 Maria Zuchowicz 
 Igor Kabanov 
 Erika Schiechtl 
 George Marsh 
 Klára Kozári 
 George J. Blundun

Sources
 Result list provided by the ISU

World Figure Skating Championships
World Figure Skating Championships
Sports competitions in Lyon
World Figure Skating Championships
International figure skating competitions hosted by France
20th century in Lyon
World Figure Skating Championships